Bjanka Murgel is a Canadian actress and model. She has had several television and film roles, including that of Mylene on the television series Lost Girls, and in a recurring role as Karina on The Latest Buzz. Murgel also appeared in Punisher: War Zone and starred as Kimberly in the movie Hidden 3D.

References

External links

Canadian film actresses
Canadian television actresses
Female models from Ontario
Living people
Place of birth missing (living people)
1983 births